SM UB-96 was a German Type UB III submarine or U-boat in the German Imperial Navy during World War I. She was commissioned into the German Imperial Navy on 3 July 1918  as SM UB-96.

UB-96 was surrendered to Britain on 21 November 1918 and broken up in Bo'ness in 1919/20.

Construction

She was built by AG Vulcan of Hamburg and following just under a year of construction, launched at Hamburg on 31 May 1918. UB-96 was commissioned later the same year under the command of Oblt.z.S. Walter Krastel. Like all Type UB III submarines, UB-96 carried 10 torpedoes and was armed with a  deck gun. UB-96 had a displacement of  while surfaced and  when submerged. Her engines enabled her to travel at  when surfaced and  when submerged.

References

Notes

Citations

Bibliography 

 

German Type UB III submarines
World War I submarines of Germany
U-boats commissioned in 1918
1918 ships
Ships built in Hamburg